Albert C. Gannaway (April 3, 1920 – August 27, 2008) was an American film director, producer and screenwriter.

Gannaway produced the children's talent program Half-Pint Party on WCBS-TV and was listed as star and co-owner of It's a Small World, an audience-participation TV program that was being filmed in 1952.

He directed western films such as Hidden Guns (1956), Raiders of Old California (1957), starring Faron Young, Marty Robbins; Buffalo Gun (1961), starring Webb Pierce; Man or Gun (1958),  and Plunderers of Painted Flats (1959).

He also directed the pioneer Daniel Boone, Trail Blazer (1956) along Ismael Rodríguez and starring Lon Chaney Jr., Faron Young, Kem Dibbs, Damian O'Flynn, Jacqueline Evans and Bruce Bennett. The song was scored by Gannaway and sang by Hal Levy.

The script of Conspiracy of Hearts (1960) was optioned by Gannaway in 1958, but he could not get financing to make the picture. He directed the 1958 drama film No Place to Land, about crop-duster pilots in post-war rural California competing with each other for work and starring John Ireland.

Filmography

References

Bibliography

External links
 

1920 births
2008 deaths
Film directors from Virginia
American film producers
Screenwriters from Virginia
American male screenwriters
Writers from Charlottesville, Virginia
20th-century American male writers
20th-century American screenwriters
Television producers from Virginia